Taiwo Kola-Ogunlade is a Nigerian integrated communications professional, currently the communications and public affairs manager for Google West Africa.

Career 
Kola-Ogunlade obtained a biochemistry honors degree from Lagos State University in Nigeria in 2001. In 2013, he got MBA from the same university. He has worked as account executive, senior account executive and account director at Insight Grey (now Insight Publisis), an integrated communications group focused on West Africa communications, working out of Lagos, Nigeria.

In December 2011, he began a role at Google as the head of communications and public affairs for West Africa. His work involves communications planning and managing all forms of external media engagement for the company as spokesperson, as well as training and supporting Africans newsrooms to incorporate new media and online strategies into news

Kola-Ogunlade was a member of the expert assessment panel for the Nigeria Social Media report by Alder Consulting in 2013, and in 2017 he was a judge for the Innovate Africa Challenge towards providing grants and funding to support data-driven journalism, investigative reporting, and newsroom digitization to media houses in Africa.

Recognition
Voted Top 100 most influential young Nigerians in 2016

References

Year of birth missing (living people)
Living people
Lagos State University alumni